The twelve-spotted skimmer (Libellula pulchella) is a common North American skimmer dragonfly, found in southern Canada and in all 48 of the contiguous U.S. states.

Each wing has three brown spots. In adult males, additional white spots form between the brown ones and at the bases of the hindwings; it is sometimes called the ten-spot skimmer for the number of these white spots.

References

 
 
 

Libellulidae
Odonata of North America
Insects of the United States
Insects of Canada
Insects described in 1770
Taxa named by Dru Drury